The following is a list of Austin Peay Governors men's basketball head coaches. The Governors have had 13 coaches in their 92-season history.

Austin Peay's current head coach is Corey Gipson. He was hired in March 2023 to replace Nate James, who was fired at the end the 2022–23 season.

References

Austin Peay

Austin Peay Governors men's basketball coaches